Lukáš Dlouhý (born 9 April 1983) is a retired professional Czech tennis player on the ATP Tour. A doubles specialist, Dlouhý reached a career-high ranking of World No. 5 in June 2009.

Career

Dlouhý has been part of two long-term doubles partnerships, first with countryman and coach Pavel Vízner and actively with Leander Paes. He has reached numerous grand slam finals with each. At the 2006 French Open, he reached the third round of the men's singles event and the semifinals of the men's doubles tournament with Vízner. In 2007, Dlouhý and Vízner reached two grand slam finals at the 2007 French Open and 2007 US Open.

He was the last coach of Barbora Strýcová before she ended her career.

Significant finals

Grand Slam finals

Doubles: 6 (2–4)

Masters 1000 finals

Doubles: 1 (1–0)

ATP career finals

Doubles: 26 (10–16)

Performance timelines

Singles

Doubles

References

External links

 
 
 
 Official website

1983 births
Living people
Czech expatriate sportspeople in Monaco
Czech male tennis players
French Open champions
Sportspeople from Písek
US Open (tennis) champions
Grand Slam (tennis) champions in men's doubles